Five Eight may refer to:
 Five Eight (band), a pop punk band from the Athens/Atlanta Georgia area.
 Five-eighth, a position in rugby league football.